Kampos is a village in the Mani Peninsula, in Messenia in southern Greece. It was the seat of the municipality of Avia. Kampos had 422 inhabitants in 2011. It is located at height of 350m, on the provincial road Kalamata-Areopoli, 22 km. away from Kalamata. 

Kampos has primary school and a junior high school. In the village there is the Byzantine church of SS. Theodores which is known for its frescoes. Also, there is the small church of St. John with 13th-century frescoes, and the tower-house of the Koumoundouros family, in which Alexandros Koumoundouros (a 19th-century politician and prime minister of Greece) was born. Near this tower-house there is the arched Mycenaean tomb of Machaon, son of Asclepius. Above the village is the castle of Zarnata.

References

Populated places in Messenia
Mani Peninsula